Rodney Redes (born 22 February 2000) is a Paraguayan professional footballer who plays as a winger for Major League Soccer club Austin FC.

Career
In July 2020, he was transferred from Club Guaraní to Austin FC. He remained on loan with Club Guaraní through 2020, and joined Austin FC in January 2021.

On October 29, 2021, Redes underwent left knee surgery.

Personal life
In January 2022, Redes obtained a U.S. green card, which qualified him as a domestic player for MLS roster purposes.

Career statistics

Club

References

External links

2000 births
Living people
Paraguayan footballers
Association football forwards
Club Guaraní players
Paraguayan Primera División players
Austin FC players
Major League Soccer players